Cantril or Cantrill may refer to:

Cantrill (surname)
 Cantril, Iowa, United States
 Cantril Farm, now Stockbridge Village, United Kingdom, former name of Liverpool residential suburb
 Mepenzolate, by trade name Cantril
 Cantril ladder, a method of measuring happiness

See also
 Cantrell
 Quantrill (disambiguation)